Mercon is the trade name for a group of technical specifications of automatic transmission fluid created by Ford. The name is a registered trademark (later becoming a brand) of Ford, which licenses the name and specifications to companies that manufacture the fluid and sell it under their own brand names. 

The original Mercon (M2C185-A) transmission fluid was introduced in January 1987. Over the years, the original Mercon was supplanted by Mercon "V", Mercon "SP", Mercon LV, and Mercon ULV, which is the latest automatic transmission fluid. Ford has upgraded the Mercon specifications over the years; the newer fluids are not always backward compatible with previous fluids. Newer 6 and 10-speed transmissions as well as Plug-In Hybrid (PHEV), and Electric Vehicle (EV) transmission technologies require specialized fluids to operate properly. There remains a market for older fluids that claim to meet the earlier fluid specifications. See the details below for backward compatibility of each fluid.

Originally the name MERCON was associated exclusively with automatic transmission fluids, later Ford released MERCON gear oils and other lubricants under the MERCON brand. Not all Mercon fluids are licensed for reselling under another brand name. All licensed Mercon fluids must have a license number on the container. If no license number is found, the fluid may not be Ford approved and the automatic transmission fluid cannot be guaranteed to meet Ford specifications. Ford, like many automobile manufacturers, uses transmissions sourced from other suppliers or transmission manufacturers around the world; these transmissions are not manufactured by Ford. Many of these automatic transmissions use unique fluids that might not be shown on this page.

History

Before Mercon: 1942–1987

1942  Motor Oil 

In 1942, The Mercury 8 and Lincoln offered cars with an optional "Liquamatic Drive" using a fluid coupling, conventional clutch, and a semi-automatic three-speed transmission. The transmission had an overrunning clutch on the transmission countershaft. The flywheel's fluid coupling used S.A.E 10 motor oil for lubrication. The transmission gearbox used traditional gear oil.  This transmission was only produced for a few months before the U.S.A. entered World War-II, production of this transmission was not resumed after the war.

1949  GM Hydra-Matic Fluid 
In April 1949, Lincoln began offering the General Motors Hydra-Matic 4-speed automatic transmission in their 1950 model year vehicles. This offering continued through the 1954 model year. Lincoln service information calls for "Lincoln Automatic Transmission Fluid". This fluid met the GM Hydra-Matic Drive fluid specifications.

This Fluid was First Used in the Following Transmissions: 
 1949 Hydra-Matic with an L-9 serial number prefix
 1950 Hydra-Matic with an L-50 serial number prefix
 1951 Hydra-Matic with an L-51 serial number prefix
 1952 Hydra-Matic with an L-52 serial number prefix
 1953 Hydra-Matic with an L-53 serial number prefix
 1954 Hydra-Matic with an L-54 serial number prefix

1950  GM Type "A" Fluid

It is important to understand that every automatic transmission produced by any vehicle manufacturer (Oldsmobile, Cadillac, Buick, Chevrolet, Pontiac, GMC, Ford, Mercury, Lincoln, Chrysler, Dodge, Desoto, Packard, and Studebaker) used GM Type "A" transmission fluids in their transmissions from 1949-1958.

In 1950, 11 years after GM released the Hydra-Matic 4-speed automatic transmission and its special Hydra-Matic Automatic Transmission Fluid, Ford released their first fully automatic transmission; the 1951 Fordomatic 3-speed transmission. This new fully automatic transmission used the GM Type "A" automatic transmission fluid specification. Ford and hundreds of other resellers, became a licensed reseller of the GM Type "A" fluid with an Armor Qualification number. The Type "A" fluid was marketed under the Ford brand name.

This Fluid was First Used in the Following Transmissions: 
 1951 Fordomatic (Borg-Warner FX) 3-Speed automatic transmission
 1954 Cruise O'Matic (Borg-Warner MX) 3-Speed automatic transmission
 1955 Lincoln TurboDrive 3-Speed automatic transmission
 1957 Ford Transmatic Drive 6-Speed Automatic Transmission for Medium-Duty and Heavy-Duty Trucks
 1958 Cruise-O-Matic 3-Speed automatic transmission
 1958 Edsel Mile-O-Matic 2-Speed automatic transmission
 1958 Mercury Multi-Drive
 1958 Lincoln TurboDrive 3-Speed automatic transmission

1958  Ford Type "A" Fluid 
In 1959, Ford released their own Type-A automatic transmission fluid specification (M2C33-A) and stopped using GM fluid specifications for their in-house transmissions. The Ford M2C33-A fluid had GM Type "A" Suffix "A" characteristics. Transmission fluid service life was fairly short, and frequent transmission oil changes were required.

1959  Type "B" Fluid 
In 1959, Ford released an updated automatic transmission fluid specification Type-B (M2C33-B). The Ford M2C33-B fluid had GM Type "A" Suffix "A" characteristics. As with the previous specification, transmission fluid service life was fairly short, and frequent transmission oil changes were required.

1960  Type "D" Fluid 

In 1960, Ford introduced the Type-D (M2C33-D) specification for service fluid use in 1960 model year vehicles. This fluid specification change provided better oxidation control, anti-wear performance, and higher static capacity capabilities were also included. Oxidation control of the fluid was measured by a new Merc-O-Matic oxidation test.

This fluid was first used in the following transmissions: 
 1964 C-4 3-Speed automatic transmission
 1966 C-6 3-Speed automatic transmission
 1968 FMX 3-Speed automatic transmission

1967  Type "F" Fluid 
In 1967, Ford introduced a new fluid specification, the Type-F fluid (M2C33-F). This fluid provided a high static coefficient of friction which resulted in harsh shifting.

The Type-F fluid specification was intended to produce a “lifetime” fluid which would never need to be changed. This is the first of many Ford “lifetime” fluids. The 1974 Ford Car Shop Manual reads "The automatic transmission is filled at the factory with "lifetime" fluid. If it is necessary to add or replace fluid, use only fluids which meet Ford Specification M2C33F.

1972  Type "G" Fluid 
In 1972, Ford of Europe introduced a new fluid specification, the Type-G fluid (M2C33-G). This fluid was used through 1981.

This fluid was first used in the following transmissions:
 Borg-Warner M35 transmissions and variants

1974  Type "CJ" Fluid 

In September 1974, Ford introduced a new fluid specification, the Type-CJ fluid (M2C138-CJ). This fluid provided smoother shifting and less gear noise by with higher dynamic friction characteristics. The Ford Type-CJ fluid specification also met the GM Dexron-II(D) and earlier fluid specifications. Ford was a licensed GM Dexron-II(D) vendor.

The Ford Type-CJ fluid was compatible with GM Dexron II(D) specifications. This compatibility may suggest to some that all Ford, Mercon, and Dexron fluids are compatible; this is not correct. Always use the factory recommended fluid for your transmission. (See the Aftermarket Automatic Transmission Fluids section below)

This fluid was first used  in the following transmissions: 
 1974 C-3 3-Speed automatic transmission in the Pinto
 1978 ATX 3-Speed automatic transmission
 1980 ATX 3-Speed automatic transmission with a Centrifugally Linked Clutch (CLC) in the torque converter
 1980 Jatco 3-Speed automatic transmission
 1980 ATX 3-Speed automatic transmission with a Fluid Linked Clutch (FLC) in the torque converter
 1980 AOD 4-Speed overdrive automatic transmission with torque converter bypass (Ford's first overdrive 4-speed)
 1983 ZF-4HP33 4-Speed overdrive automatic transmission (Dexron-II(D))

1981  Type "H" Fluid 

As a result of the 1973 OPEC Oil Embargo and fuel shortages, the U.S. government created the Corporate Average Fuel Economy (CAFE) regulations in 1975. The regulations were to be fully implemented by the 1978 model year. The automotive industry responded by changing to three typically unused transmission technologies: 
 A 4th gear (overdrive) 
 A Torque Converter Clutch (TCC)
 Front Wheel Drive (FWD).

The introduction of the TCC led to customer complaints of a shudder while driving. All vehicle manufacturers made changes to their ATF specifications and the controls of their TCC to try and alleviate the problem. GM released the Dexron-II (D) fluid specification in 1978 and Chrysler released the ATF+2 fluid specification in 1980, and Ford released the Type-H fluid (M2C166-H) specification in June 1981.

The Type-H fluid specification provided improved friction characteristics in lock-up torque converters (reducing shudder during application and release). With this new specification, Ford introduced the aluminum beaker oxidation test (ABOT) to replace the older Merc-O-Matic oxidation test.

The Ford Type-H fluid was compatible with GM Dexron II(D) specifications. This compatibility may suggest to some that all Ford, Mercon, and Dexron fluids are compatible; this is not correct. Always use the factory recommended fluid for your transmission. (See the Aftermarket Automatic Transmission Fluids section below)

This fluid was first used in the following transmissions: 
 1982 C-5 (C4 with Torque converter Clutch (TCC)) 3-Speed automatic transmission
 1985 A4LD (C3 with overdrive) 4-Speed automatic transmission
 1986 AXOD 4-Speed automatic transaxle
 1986 Electronic A4LD 4-Speed automatic transmission

MERCON Fluids: 1987  Today

1987  MERCON 

In January 1987, Ford released the original Mercon fluid specification (M2C185-A). Mercon became a trademarked fluid with qualification and licensing of fluids to ensure quality in the marketplace. This original Mercon Specification was backward compatible with the 1981 Ford Type-H fluid and the 1958 GM Type "A" Suffix "A" fluid.

NOTICE: This version of Mercon was compatible with GM's Dexron-II(D) and later formulations were compatible with Dexron-III(H); however, Future versions of Mercon (Mercon V, Mercon SP, Mercon LV, Mercon ULV) are not compatible with GM's Dexron-III(H) or any newer version of Dexron (Dexron-VI, Dexron HP, Dexron ULV).

This fluid was first used in the following transmissions: 
 1989 E4OD (C-6 with overdrive) Ford's first electronic control 4-Speed automatic transmission
 1990 4EAT-G Mazda 4-Speed automatic transmission
 1990 F-4EAT 4-Speed automatic transmission
 1990 AXOD-E 4-Speed automatic transaxle
 1992 AOD-E (Electronic AOD) 4-Speed automatic transmission
 1993 AOD-EW/4R70W 4-Speed automatic transmission
 1994 AX4S 4-Speed automatic transaxle
 1994 CD4E Batavia 4-Speed automatic transmission
 1995 AX4N/4F50N 4-Speed automatic transmission
 1995 4R44E 4-Speed automatic transmission
 1995 4R55E 4-Speed automatic transmission
 1997 5R44 5-Speed automatic transmission (Ford's first 5-speed automatic transmission)
 1997 5R55 5-Speed automatic transmission

1996  MERCON V 

In 1996, Ford released the Mercon "V" fluid specification (M2C202-B). Ford Technical Service Bulletin (TSB) 06-14-04 indicates that Mercon "V" is to replace the original Mercon fluid.

This fluid was first used in the following transmissions: 
 1997 4R70W 4-speed automatic transmission
1998 4R100 4-speed automatic transmission
 2000 4F27E 4-speed automatic transaxle

The Mercon "V" specification was revised in 2002 (M2C919-E). This revised fluid was first used in the following transmissions: 
 2003 4R75E 4-speed automatic transmission
 2003 4R75W 4-speed automatic transmission
 2003 5R110W 5-speed automatic transmission

2001  MERCON SP 
In August 2001, Ford released the Mercon "SP" fluid specification (M2C919-D).

Ford SSM 21114 (November 26, 2009) indicates that Mercon Replace "SP" is to be replaced with Mercon LV on Torqshift transmissions from the 2003 through 2008 model years. This SSM does not apply to the ZF 6HP26 transmission.

This fluid first used in the following transmissions:
 2001 5R110W Torque Shift 5-Speed automatic transmission 
 2005-2008 ZF 6HP26 6-Speed automatic transmission in Lincoln Navigator

2005  MERCON LV 

In December 2005, Ford released the Mercon "LV" fluid specification (M2C938-A).

This fluid was first used in the following transmissions: 
2006 6R60 ZF 6-Speed automatic transmission
2006 FNR5 Mazda 5-Speed automatic transmission

This specification was revised in 2007 for use in the following transmissions:
2007 6F50 6-speed automatic transaxle
2007 6R80 6-speed automatic transaxle
2009 6F35 6-speed automatic transaxle

This specification was revised again in 2010 (M2C938-A2) and was optimized for anti-Squawk performance of clutches. This revised fluid was first used in the following transmissions: 
 2011 6R140 6-speed automatic transmission
 2013 HF-35 eCVT hybrid transaxle

2014  MERCON ULV 
The fluid specification for Mercon-ULV (Ultra-Low Viscosity) was introduced on January 2, 2014. Mercon ULV is composed of a Group 3+ Base oil and additives needed for the proper operation of the 2017 and above Ford 10R80 and the GM 10L90 10-Speed rear wheel drive automatic transmission.

This transmission and the transmission fluid specification was co-developed by Ford and GM. The current specification that defines the fluid is FORD WSS-M2C949-A. This fluid is also marketed as Dexron ULV.

NOTICE: The quart containers of Mercon ULV must be shaken to stir up the additives before pouring. This fluid is not backward compatible with any previous fluids.

This fluid was first used in the following transmissions: 
 2017 10R80 10-speed automatic transmission
 2017 6F15 6-speed automatic transaxle
 2017 6R100 6-speed automatic transmission

Ford "Lifetime" ATF

The 1967 Ford Type-F fluid specification was intended to produce a “lifetime” fluid which would never need to be changed. This was the first of many Ford “lifetime” fluids. The 1974 Ford Car Shop Manual reads "The automatic transmission is filled at the factory with "lifetime" fluid. If it is necessary to add or replace fluid, use only fluids which meet Ford Specification M2C33F. Many other transmission manufacturers have followed with their own "Lifetime" automatic transmission fluids".

Example Maintenance Schedule

Lifetime automatic transmission fluids made from higher quality base oil and an additive package are more chemically stabile, less reactive, and do not experience oxidation as easily as lower quality fluids made from lower quality base oil and an additive package. Therefore, higher quality transmission fluids can last a long time in normal driving conditions (Typically 100,000 miles (160,000 km) or more).

The definition of 'Lifetime Fluid" differs from transmission manufacturer to transmission manufacturer. Always consult the vehicle maintenance guide for the proper service interval for the fluid in your transmission and your driving conditions.

2018 Ford F-150 Example: According to the Scheduled Maintenance Guide of a 2018 Ford F-150 with "Lifetime Fluid" could have three different fluid service intervals depending on how the vehicle is driven:

1. Normal Driving
 Normal commuting with highway driving
 No or moderate load or towing
 Flat to moderately hilly roads
 No extended idling
Under these driving conditions, the automatic transmission fluid needs to be serviced after every 150,000 miles (240,000 km).

2. Severe Driving
 Moderate to heavy load or towing
 Mountainous or off-road conditions
 Extended idling
 Extended hot or cold operation
Under these driving conditions, the automatic transmission fluid needs to be serviced after every 30,000 miles (48,000 km).

3. Extreme Driving
 Maximum load or towing
 Extreme hot or cold operation
Under these driving conditions, the automatic transmission fluid needs to be serviced also after every 30,000 miles.

See also
 Dexron, ATM brand by GM 
 Whale oil, an important constituent of ATF until 1974

References

External links

 Transmission fluids (including "Mercon" products) at Motorcraft
  A Look at Changes in Automatic Transmission Fluid
 The History of Automatic Transmission Fluid - ATF History Part 1 
 69 Years of Ford Automatic Transmission Fluid  - ATF History Part 3
 Changing Gears: The Development of the Automotive Transmission
 Ford Service Information Subscription Access

Ford transmissions
Hydraulic fluids
Automotive chemicals
Automobile transmissions
Petroleum based lubricants
Oils